Adventure in Iraq is a 1943 American adventure film directed by D. Ross Lederman and starring John Loder, Ruth Ford, Warren Douglas and Paul Cavanagh. The film is based on the 1921 play The Green Goddess by William Archer.

Plot

Three Americans flying a small plane to Cairo, Egypt, are forced by engine failure to land in Iraq and are taken prisoner by an Arab chieftain.

Cast
John Loder as George Torrence
Ruth Ford as Tess Torrence
Warren Douglas as Doug Everett
Paul Cavanagh as Sheik Ahmid Bel Nor
Barry Bernard as Devins
Peggy Carson as Timah Devins
Martin Garralaga as High Priest
Bill Crago as Air Force Capt. Carson
John George as Small Iraqi in Courtyard
Manuel López as Tall Priest in Courtyard
Bill Edwards as Air Force Sergeant

Production
The film was made by Warner Brothers as a programmer. It was a remake of Archer's play The Green Goddess, updating the action to modern Iraq. It encountered strong objections from the OWI, who charged that its plot was unintentionally both anti-British and anti-Arab and was potentially offensive to America's ally and to neutral Arab countries. The film was already granted an export licence, but pressure from the State Department overrode this. Consequently, it was the only Warners' film not to receive an overseas release during the 1940s.

Reception
The film earned $147,000 domestically and did not earn anything outside the US because it was not released there.

References

Bibliography
 Glancy, H. Mark. When Hollywood Loved Britain: The Hollywood 'British' Film 1939-1945. Manchester University Press, 1999.

External links

1943 films
American black-and-white films
1940s English-language films
1943 adventure films
Warner Bros. films
American films based on plays
American aviation films
Films set in Iraq
World War II films made in wartime
Films directed by D. Ross Lederman
American adventure films